Ambinaninony is a village and rural commune in the Brickaville district (or: Vohibinany (district)) in the Atsinanana Region, Madagascar.

It is located near on the banks of the Rongaronga river and on the National Road 2 (RN2).

References

Populated places in Atsinanana